Eucosma ochricostana is a species of moth of the family Tortricidae, found in Jilin, China.

References

Moths described in 1972
Eucosmini